Diamonds and Chills is a studio album by American country music artist Margo Smith. It was released in September 1980 via Warner Bros. Records and was produced by David Barnes. It was Smith's eighth studio album released in her music career and her last to be released on the Warner Bros. label. The project spawned two singles, which charted on the country singles survey in 1980: "My Guy" and the title track. Diamonds and Chills was reviewed favorably by critics.

Background and content
After several major hits in the 1970s, Margo Smith transitioned towards a "sexier" marketing persona, according to writer Sandra Brennan. In 1979, she had two major hits, including the top ten song "Still a Woman" which helped signify this transition. Smith attempted to carry her new image into 1980 with the recording of a new studio record, Diamonds and Chills. The album was recorded at the Woodland Sound Studio, located in Nashville, Tennessee. The sessions were held in March 1980 and was produced by David Barnes. Diamonds and Chills contained ten tracks. Unlike previous records, the project did not include any songs composed by Smith herself. The album featured a cover of Mary Wells' "My Guy," Brenda Holloway's "Every Little Bit Hurts," Parker McGee's "I Just Can't Say No to You" and Chris Thompson's "If You Remember Me".

Release and reception

Diamonds and Chills was released in September 1980 on Warner Bros. Records. It marked the eighth studio recording of Smith's music career and her sixth for the Warner label. The album was originally distributed as a vinyl LP containing five tracks on either side of the record. The album was also offered as a cassette with an identical track listing. Diamonds and Chills received a positive response from Billboard magazine, who named the record among its "top album picks" in September 1980. Reviewers praised the album's balance of country and pop musical styles. They also praised the album as a whole: "Smith shifts from her former traditional country inflections into a lighter sultry updated style that is comfortably engaging." In later years, the record received three out of five stars from AllMusic. 

The album also spawned two singles that were released in 1980. The album's cover of "My Guy" was released as the project's first single in June 1980. The song reached number 43 on the Billboard Hot Country Singles chart later that year. The album's title track ("You Give Me Diamonds, He Gives Me Chills") was issued as the record's second single in September 1980. The song peaked at number 52 on the Billboard country chart.

Track listing

Vinyl and cassette versions

Personnel
All credits are adapted from the liner notes of Diamonds and Chills.

Musical personnel
 Lea Jane Berinati – Background vocals
 Steve Brantley – Background vocals
 Tom Brannon – Background vocals
 Jerry Carrigan – Drums
 Mark Casstevens – Acoustic guitar
 Johnny Christopher – Acoustic guitar
 Jackie Cusic – Background vocals
 Bruce Dees – Background vocals
 Shane Keister – Keyboards
 John Komrada – Flugelhorn
 Sheri Kramer – Background vocals
 The Shelly Kurland Strings – String section
 Barry McDonald – Flugelhorn
 Donna Sheridan Levine – Background vocals
 Lisa Silver – Background vocals
 Margo Smith – Lead vocals
 Diane Tidwell – Background vocals
 Paul Uhrig – Bass
 Reggie Young – Electric guitar

Technical personnel
 David Barnes – Producer
 Bobbe Joy – Makeup
 Danny M. Hilley – Engineer
 Rick McCollister – Mastering
 Patty Michels – Fashion stylist
 Farrell Morris – Percussion
 Tim Ritchie – Art direction, design
 Mitsu Sato of Platoon – Hair stylist
 Hank Williams – Mastering
 Dick Zimmerman – Photography

Release history

References

1980 albums
Margo Smith albums
Warner Records albums